Euastropsis is a genus of algae belonging to the family Hydrodictyaceae.

Species:
 Euastropsis richteri (Schmidle) Lagerh.

References

Sphaeropleales
Sphaeropleales genera